Snafu 10-31-'91 is the second live album by The Radiators, and their sixth album overall.

Overview

After parting company with Epic Records, The Radiators returned to their own Croaker label in 1992 with their first live album in a decade.  The album was recorded at a Halloween concert hosted by the New Orleans fan group, the Krewe of SNAFU.  It was the first official release by the band to feature numerous covers of other artists, in addition to compositions by The Radiators' chief songwriter, Ed Volker.

Track listing
 "Got My Mojo Working" (Muddy Waters) — 6:22
 "Let's Radiate" (Ed Volker) — 4:40
 "Swamp Rat" (Volker) — 4:48
 "The Twist" (Hank Ballard) — 2:59
 "You Gotta Move" (Fred McDowell) — 4:47
 "Up on Cripple Creek" (Robbie Robertson) — 7:38
 "Down on the Corner" (John Fogerty) — 3:26
 "No Expectations" (Mick Jagger, Keith Richards) — 7:20
 "Crossroads" (Robert Johnson) — 6:06
 "Outlaw Blues" (Bob Dylan) — 5:43
 "Crawfish Head" (Volker) — 1:45
 "All Meat" (Volker) — 5:52
 "Automatic" (Volker) -6:32

Credits
 Ed Volker – percussion, keyboards, vocals
 Dave Malone – guitars, vocals
 Camile Baudoin – guitars, vocals
 Reggie Scanlan – bass
 Frank Bua – drums
 Glenn Sears – percussion
 The Radiators – producer

The Radiators (American band) albums
1992 live albums